British Bangladeshis are people of Bangladeshi origin who have attained citizenship in the United Kingdom, through immigration and historical naturalisation. The term can also refer to their descendants. Bengali Muslims have prominently been migrating to the UK since the 1940s. Migration reached its peak during the 1970s,  with most originating from the Sylhet Division. The largest concentration live in east London boroughs, such as Tower Hamlets. This large diaspora in London leads people in Sylhet to refer to British Bangladeshis as Londoni.

Bangladeshis form one of the UK's largest group of people of overseas descent and are also one of the country's youngest and fastest growing communities. The 2011 UK Census recorded nearly half-a-million residents of Bangladeshi ethnicity. While in the 2021 UK census, Bangladeshis in England and Wales enumerated 644,881, or 1.1% of the total England and Wales population. British Bangladeshis had the highest overall relative poverty rate of any ethnic group in the UK with 65% of Bangladeshis living in low income households, as for 2005.

History

Bengalis have been present in Britain as early as the 19th century. One of the earliest records of a Bengali migrant, by the name of Saeed Ullah, can be found in Robert Lindsay's autobiography. Saeed Ullah was said to have migrated not only for work but also to attack Lindsay and avenge his Sylheti elders for the Muharram Rebellion of 1782. Other early records of arrivals from the region that is now known as Bangladesh are of Sylheti cooks in London during 1873, in the employment of the East India Company, who travelled to the UK as lascars on ships to work in restaurants.

The first educated South Asian to travel to Europe and live in Britain was I'tisam-ud-Din, a Bengali Muslim cleric, munshi and diplomat to the Mughal Empire who arrived in 1765 with his servant Muhammad Muqim during the reign of King George III. He wrote of his experiences and travels in his Persian book, Shigurf-nama-i-Wilayat (or 'Wonder Book of Europe'). This is also the earliest record of literature by a British Asian. Also during the reign of George III, the hookah-bardar (hookah servant/preparer) of James Achilles Kirkpatrick was said to have robbed and cheated Kirkpatrick, making his way to England and stylising himself as the Prince of Sylhet. The man was waited upon by the Prime Minister of Great Britain William Pitt the Younger, and then dined with the Duke of York before presenting himself in front of the King.

Many Sylheti people believed that seafaring was a historical and cultural inheritance due to a large proportion of Sylheti Muslims being descended from foreign traders, lascars and businessman from the Middle East and Central Asia who migrated to the Sylhet region before and after the Conquest of Sylhet. Khala Miah, who was a Sylheti migrant, claimed this was a very encouraging factor for Sylhetis to travel to Calcutta aiming to eventually reach the United States and United Kingdom. A crew of lascars would be led by a Serang. Serangs were ordered to recruit crew members themselves by the British and so they would go into their own villages and areas in the Sylhet region often recruiting their family and neighbours. The British had no problem with this as it guaranteed the group of lascars would be in harmony. According to lascars Moklis Miah and Mothosir Ali, up to forty lascars from the same village would be in the same ship.

Shah Abdul Majid Qureshi is said to be the first Sylheti to open a restaurant in the country. It was called Dilkush Delight and located in Soho. Another one of his restaurants, known as India Centre, alongside
early Sylheti migrant Ayub Ali Master's Shah Jolal cafe, became a hub for the British Asian community and a site where the India League would hold meetings attracting influential figures such as Subhas Chandra Bose, Krishna Menon and Mulk Raj Anand. Ayub Ali was also the president of the United Kingdom Muslim League having links with Liaquat Ali Khan and Mohammad Ali Jinnah.

Some ancestors of British Bangladeshis went to the UK before World War I. Author Caroline Adams records that in 1925 a lost Bengali man was searching for other Bengali settlers in London. These first few arrivals started the process of "chain migration" mainly from one region of Bangladesh, Sylhet, which led to substantial numbers of people migrating from rural areas of the region, creating links between relatives in Britain and the region. They mainly immigrated to the United Kingdom to find work, achieve a better standard of living, and to escape conflict. During the pre-state years, the 1950s and 1960s, Bengali men immigrated to London in search of employment. Most settled in Tower Hamlets, particularly around Spitalfields and Brick Lane. In 1971, Bangladesh (until then known as "East Pakistan") fought for its independence from West Pakistan in what was known as the Bangladesh Liberation War. In the region of Sylhet, this led some to join the Mukti Bahini, or Liberation Army.

In the 1970s, changes in immigration laws encouraged a new wave of Bangladeshis to come to the UK and settle. Job opportunities were initially limited to low paid sectors, with unskilled and semi-skilled work in small factories and the textile trade being common. When the 'Indian' restaurant concept became popular, some Sylhetis started to open cafes. From these small beginnings a network of Bangladeshi restaurants, shops and other small businesses became established in Brick Lane and surrounding areas. The influence of Bangladeshi culture and diversity began to develop across the East London boroughs.

The early immigrants lived and worked mainly in cramped basements and attics within the Tower Hamlets area.  The men were often illiterate, poorly educated, and spoke little English, so they could not interact well with the English-speaking population and could not enter higher education. Some became targets for businessmen, who sold their properties to Sylhetis, even though they had no legal claim to the buildings.

By the late 1970s, the Brick Lane area had become predominantly Bengali, replacing the former Jewish community which had declined. Jews migrated to outlying suburbs of London, as they integrated with the majority British population. Jewish bakeries were turned into curry houses, jewellery shops became sari stores, and synagogues became dress factories. The synagogue at the corner of Fournier Street and Brick Lane became the Jamme Masjid or 'Great London Mosque', which continues to serve the Bangladeshi community to this day. This building represents the history of successive communities of immigrants in this part of London. It was built in 1743 as a French Protestant church; in 1819 it became a Methodist chapel, and in 1898 was designated as the Spitalfields Great Synagogue. It was finally sold, to become the Jamme Masjid.

The period also however saw a rise in the number of attacks on Bangladeshis in the area, in a reprise of the racial tensions of the 1930s, when Oswald Mosley's Blackshirts had marched against the Jewish communities. In nearby Bethnal Green the anti-immigrant National Front became active, distributing leaflets on the streets and holding meetings. White youths known as "skinheads" appeared in the Brick Lane area, vandalising property and reportedly spitting on Bengali children and assaulting women.  Bengali children were allowed out of school early; women walked to work in groups to shield them from potential violence. Parents began to impose curfews on their children, for their own safety; flats were protected against racially motivated arson by the installation of fire-proof letterboxes.

 
On 4 May 1978, Altab Ali, a 25-year-old Bangladeshi clothing worker, was murdered by three teenage boys as he walked home from work in a racially motivated attack. The murder took place near the corner of Adler Street and Whitechapel Road, by St Mary's Churchyard. This murder mobilised the Bangladeshi community in Britain. Demonstrations were held in the area of Brick Lane against the National Front, and groups such as the Bangladesh Youth Movement were formed. On 14 May, over 7,000 people, mostly Bangladeshis, took part in a demonstration against racial violence, marching behind Altab Ali's coffin to Hyde Park. Some youths formed local gangs and carried out reprisal attacks on their skinhead opponents (see Youth gangs).

The name “Altab Ali” became associated with a movement of resistance against racist attacks, and remains linked with this struggle for human rights. His murder was the trigger for the first significant political organisation against racism by local Bangladeshis. The identification and association of British Bangladeshis with Tower Hamlets owes much to this campaign. A park has been named after Altab Ali at the street where he was murdered. In 1993, racial violence was incited by the anti-immigration British National Party (BNP); several Bangladeshi students were severely injured, but the BNP's attempted inroads were stopped after demonstrations of Bangladeshi resolve.

In 1986, the House of Commons Home Affairs Committee's race relations and immigration sub-committee conducted an inquiry called Bangladeshis in Britain. In evidence given to the committee by Home Office officials, they noted that an estimated 100,000 Bangladeshis lived in Great Britain. The evidence also noted issues of concern to the Bangladesh community, including "immigration arrangements; relationships with the police (particularly in the context of racial harassment or attacks); and the provision of suitable housing, education, and personal, health and social services". A Home Office official noted that the Sylheti dialect was "the ordinary means of communication for about 95 per cent of the people who come from Bangladesh" and that all three Bengali interpreters employed at Heathrow Airport spoke Sylheti, including Abdul Latif.

In 1988, a "friendship link" between the city of St Albans in Hertfordshire and the municipality of Sylhet was created by the district council under the presidency of Muhammad Gulzar Hussain of Bangladesh Welfare Association, St Albans. BWA St Albans were able to name a road in Sylhet municipality (now Sylhet City Corporation) called St Albans Road. This link between the two cities was established when the council supported housing project in the city as part of the International Year of Shelter for the Homeless initiative. It was also created because Sylhet is the area of origin for the largest ethnic minority group in St Albans. In April 2001, the London Borough of Tower Hamlets council officially renamed the 'Spitalfields' electoral ward  Spitalfields and Banglatown. Surrounding streets were redecorated, with lamp posts painted in green and red, the colours of the Bangladeshi flag. By this stage the majority living in the ward were of Bangladeshi origin—nearly 60% of the population.

Demographics

Population

Bangladeshis in the UK are largely a young population, heavily concentrated in London's inner boroughs. In the 2011 Census 451,529 UK residents specified their ethnicity as Bangladeshi, forming 0.7% of the total population. In the 2021 census there were 644,881 Bangladeshis in England and Wales, forming 1.1% of the total England and Wales population. The UK is also the third single largest export destination for Bangladesh and Britain has the largest Bengali population outside of Bangladesh and West Bengal.

Nearly half of the population live in London, with a heavy concentration mainly in East London borough's. London's Bangladeshi population in 2021 was 322,054, the highest concentrations were found in Tower Hamlets (34.6% of total borough population), Newham (15.9%), Redbridge (10.3%), Barking and Dagenham (10.2%) and Camden (6.8%). The largest populations outside London are in Birmingham, where there were 48,232 Bangladeshis in 2021, Oldham with 21,754, and Luton with a population of 20,630.

Based on the 2011 census, 52% of Bangladeshis were British-born, while 48% were born outside of the UK of which 212,000 were born in Bangladesh. In the same year, there was a  slightly larger male than female population, with 52% male and 48% female. Bangladeshis are one of the youngest of the UK's ethnic populations. In 2011, 38.3% were aged between 0–17, 56.9% were aged between 18-59 and only 4.9% were aged 60 and over.

Majority of British Bangladeshis originate from several administrative sub-districts (known in Bangladesh as upazilas or thanas) of one of the four districts in the Sylhet Division. Most originate from the  Sylhet District thanas of Balaganj, Beanibazar, Bishwanath, Fenchuganj and Golapganj. Thanas outside of the Sylhet District which have the highest numbers of origin include Jagannathpur of Sunamganj District, Moulvibazar, and Nabiganj of Habiganj District.

Since 2012/13, it is estimated that around 20,000 Italian Bangladeshis had settled in the UK, according to the Bangladeshi Italian Welfare Association (based on figures provided by the Embassy of Italy, London). Majority had settled within the long-established Bangladeshi community in East London. Many were skilled graduates who left their homes in South Asia attracted by jobs in Italy's industrial north, but moved to the UK when Italian manufacturing jobs went into decline.

Employment and education
Bangladeshis are now mainly employed in the distribution, hotel and restaurant industries. New generation Bangladeshis, however, aspire to professional careers, becoming doctors, engineers, IT management specialists, teachers and in business. In 2011 within England and Wales, nearly-half (48%) of British Bangladeshis in the 16 to 64 age group were reported to be employed, while 40% were economically inactive and 10% unemployed. Men were more likely to be employed than women, with 65% of men in employment against 30% of women. Of those employed, 53% were working within the low-skill sector. Bangladeshis were most likely to be employed in accommodation and food services (27.3%), 18.8% in wholesale and retail trade, 9.2% in education, 8.8% in human health and social work, and the rest in many other sectors of employment.

Ofsted reports from secondary schools have shown that many Bangladeshi pupils are making significant progress, compared with other ethnic minority groups. Girls are more likely to do better in education than boys; 55% of girls are achieving 5 or more A*-C at GCSE, compared to 41% boys, as of 2004. The overall achievement rate for Bangladeshi pupils was 48%, compared with 53% for all UK pupils, in 2004. By 2013, the British Bangladeshi achievement rate (5 or more A*-C at GCSE) had increased considerably to 61%, compared to 56% for White British students and 51% for British Pakistani students. It was reported in 2014, there were a total of 60,699 graduates of Bangladeshi descent. In November 2015, an Institute for Fiscal Studies (IFS) report said that Bangladeshi children living in the UK have a nearly 49 percent higher chance on average of a university education than white British pupils.

Until 1998, Tower Hamlets, where the concentration of British Bangladeshis is greatest was the worst performing local authority in England. Until 2009, Bangladeshis in England performed worse than the national average. In 2015, 62 per cent of British Bangladeshis got five good GCSEs, including English and Maths which is five per cent above the average, and Bangladeshi girls outperformed boys by eight per cent. In February 2018, according to a report from social mobility by the Sutton Trust, British Bangladeshi students are over six times more likely than white students to stay living at home and studying nearby.

In March 2015, Nick de Bois, MP for Enfield North, persuaded the British government to stop plans by the exam boards to drop Bengali GCSE and A Level qualifications.

According to research by Yaojun Li from the University of Manchester in 2016, while the employment rate of Bangladeshis has improved and the proportion of women in work has risen by one-third in the last five years, it is still weaker than educational performance. Nine per cent of working age Bangladeshis are unemployed which is almost twice the national average.

In December 2016, according to a Social Mobility Commission study, children of Bangladeshi origin are among the British Asians who 'struggle for top jobs despite better school results'. The UK's Social Mobility Commission commissioned an 'Ethnicity, Gender and Social Mobility' report with research carried out by academics from LKMco and Education Datalab which found that there has been an increase in educational attainment for Bangladeshi origin pupils in the UK and their performance has improved at a more rapid rate than other ethnic groups in recent years at almost every key stage of education. Almost half of young Bangladeshi people from the poorest quintile go to university. However, this is not reflected or translating in labour market outcomes because although young people from Bangladeshi backgrounds are more likely to "succeed in education and go to university," they are less likely to go on to "find employment or secure jobs in managerial or professional occupations." The report also found that female Bangladeshi graduations are less likely to gain managerial and professional roles than male Bangladeshis graduates, despite achieving at school. British Bangladeshi women earn less than other ethnic minority groups.

Health
A survey in the 1990s on the visible communities in Britain by the Policy Studies Institute concluded that British Bangladeshis continue to be among the most severely disadvantaged. Bangladeshis had the highest rates of illness in the UK, in 2001. Bangladeshi men were three times as likely to visit their doctor as men in the general population. Bangladeshis also had the highest rates of people with disabilities, and were more likely to smoke than any other ethnic group, at a rate of 44% in 1999 in England. Smoking was very common amongst the men, but very few women smoked, perhaps due to cultural customs. Research suggests that British Bangladeshis need intervention to prevent diabetes at a body mass index (BMI) of 21, which is lower than the otherwise recommended threshold.

Housing 
The average number of people living in each Bangladeshi household is 5, larger than all other ethnic groups. Households which contained a single person were 9%; houses containing a married couple were 54%, pensioner households were 2%. There were twice as many people per room as white households, with 43% living in homes with insufficient bedroom space. A third of Bangladeshi homes contain more than one family—64% of all overcrowded households in Tower Hamlets are Bangladeshi. In England and Wales, only 37% of Bangladeshis owned households compared to 69% of the population, those with social rented tenure is 48%, the largest of which in Tower Hamlets (82%) and Camden (81%).

British Bangladeshis are around three times more likely to be in poverty compared to their white counterparts, according to a 2015 report entitled 'Ethnic Inequalities' by the Centre for Social Investigation (CSI) at Nuffield College at University of Oxford. The research found that poverty rate is 46% of people of Bangladeshi background – compared with 16% for the white British in 2009–11. "Bangladeshi background are also more likely to have a limiting long-term illness or disability and to live in more crowded conditions," it noted. In Tower Hamlets, an estimated one-third of young Bangladeshis are unemployed, one of the highest such rates in the country.

Culture

Language

The most common language spoken among British Bangladeshis is Sylheti, with around an estimated 400,000 speakers. Sylheti is generally considered as a dialect of Bengali, though some linguists view it as an independent language. In the context of diglossia in Bangladesh, Sylheti is viewed as a regional dialect while standard Bengali (the official language), is the standard of communication and education. In the UK however, Sylheti being used as the main vernacular by a majority uninfluenced by standard Bengali has led some to view it as a distinct language. There had been unsuccessful attempts by a fringe group during the 1980s to recognise Sylheti as a language in Tower Hamlets, which lacked support from the rest of the local Sylheti community as most favoured Standard Bengali to be taught in "mother tongue" classes.

Standard Bengali maintains its prominence in British Bangladeshi media and is considered as a prestige language which helps to foster a cultural or national identity linked with Bangladesh. Parents therefore encourage young people to attend Bengali classes to learn the language. Although many Sylheti speakers find this learning progress difficult in the UK.

The Language Movement Day or Language Martyrs' Day (Shôhid Dibôs) commemorates the martyrs of the Bengali language movement, which other than in Bangladesh is also held annually in the UK. In Tower Hamlets, the Shaheed Minar was erected in Altab Ali Park in 1999. A similar monument was built in Westwood, in Oldham, through a local council regeneration. The event takes place at midnight on 20 February annually, where the community come together to lay wreaths at the monument. Around 2,500 families, councillors and community members paid their respect at Altab Ali Park, as of February 2009.

Some linguists are attempting to revive a script that was historically used in the Sylhet region called Sylheti Nagri. The Sylheti Project of SOAS University of London is notable for promoting Sylheti in its exclusivity. In 2017, British schools enlisted Sylheti in the list of native languages spoken by students. BBC News has also broadcast online videos relating to COVID-19 in five major South Asian languages which included Sylheti.

Based on the 2011 census, English is spoken as a main language by nearly half  of the population. While those who considered Bengali (includes Sylheti and Chittagonian) as their main language, more than half (70%) were proficient in speaking English. English tends to be spoken among the younger generation, and Bengali/Sylheti with the older generation.

One way in which British Bangladeshis try to hold on to their links to Bangladesh is by sending their British-born children to school there. Pupils are taught the British curriculum and children born in the UK are dotted among those in the classroom.

Italian is spoken by the recent Italian Bangladeshi immigrants to the UK.

Religion

According to the 2011 census, majority of the Bangladeshi population were Muslim (89.9%), while a small minority followed other religions which include, Christian (1.5%), Hindu (0.9%), and all other religions (0.4%). Those who responded with no religion were 1.4%, and 5.9% did not give any preference. In London, Bangladeshi Muslims make up 24% of all London Muslims, more than any other single ethnic group in the capital. The largest affiliations are the Deobandis (mainly of Tablighi Jamaat), the Jamaat-e-Islami movement, and the Sufi Barelvi movement (which includes the Fultoli). The Hizb ut-Tahrir, and the Salafi movement also have a small following.

A majority of older women wear the burqa, and young women are wearing the niqab, whereas in Bangladesh, comparatively few women do so; this has been described as a "British phenomenon". Arabic is also learned by children, many of whom attend Qur'an classes at mosques or the madrasah. Many male youths are also involved with Islamic groups, which include the Young Muslim Organisation, affiliated with the Islamic Forum Europe. This group is based in Tower Hamlets, and has thus attracted mainly young Bangladeshi Muslims. It has been increasingly associated with the East London Mosque, which is one of the largest mosques used predominantly by Bangladeshis. In 2004, the mosque created a new extension attached, the London Muslim Centre which holds up to 10,000 people.

Celebrations

Significant Bengali events or celebrations are celebrated by the community annually. The Boishakhi Mela is a celebration of the Bengali New Year, celebrated by the Bangladeshi community every year. Held each April–May since 1997 in London's Banglatown, it is the largest Asian open-air event in Europe, and the largest Bengali festival outside Bangladesh. In Bangladesh and West Bengal it is known as the Pohela Boishakh. The event is broadcast live across different continents; it features a funfair, music and dance displays on stages, with people dressed in colourful traditional clothes, in Weavers Field and Allen Gardens in Bethnal Green. The Mela is also designed to enhance the area's community identity, bringing together the best of Bengali culture. Brick Lane is the main destination where curry and Bengali spices are served throughout the day. As of 2009, the Mela was organised by the Tower Hamlets council, attracting 95,000 people, featuring with popular artists such as Momtaz Begum, Nukul Kumar Bishwash, Mumzy Stranger and many others.

The Nowka Bais is a traditional boat racing competition. It was first brought to the United Kingdom in 2007 to commemorate the 1000th birthday of Oxfordshire. It has gained recognition and support from Queen Elizabeth II and others. Since 2015, it has been hosted in Birmingham, where it is the largest cultural event in the West Midlands and the largest boat race in Britain, attracting thousands of people.

Marriage

Bangladeshi weddings are celebrated with a combination of Bengali and Muslim traditions, and play a large part in developing and maintaining social ties. Many marriages are between the British diaspora (Londonis) and the native-born Bangladeshis. Sometimes men will go to Bangladesh to get married, however recently more women are marrying in Bangladesh. Second or third generation Bangladeshis are more likely to get married in the UK within the British culture. However this exposure has created a division between preferences for arranged marriages or for love marriages. Tradition holds that the bride's family must buy the bridegroom's family a set of new furniture to be housed in the family home, with all original furniture given away or discarded. The average Bangladeshi outlay for a wedding is £30–60,000 for a single wedding, including decorations, venue, food, clothing and limousines, all areas in which there is competition between families.

Forced marriage
Forced marriages are rare; the British High Commission has been involved with many cases concerning on British citizens. Another media highlight includes a Bangladeshi-born National Health Service doctor Humayra Abedin. She was deceived by her parents after asking her to arrive at their home in Dhaka, a court ordered her parents to hand her over to the British High Commission. The commission has been reported to have handled 56 cases from April 2007 to March 2008. According to 2017 data by the Forced Marriage Unit (FMU), a joint effort between the Home Office and the Foreign and Commonwealth Office, of the 129 callers related to Bangladesh, 71% were female and 29% were male, 16% were under the age of 15 and another 12% were aged 16–17. The majority of the victims were likely in the 18-21 age group and the proportion of males were higher for Bangladeshis than other groups. However, Pakistan has the highest number of cases of forced marriage.

Cuisine

British Bangladeshis consume traditional Bangladeshi food, in particular rice with curry. Many traditional Bengali dishes are served with rice, including chicken, lentil (dahl), and fish. Another popular food is shatkora, which is a citrus and tangy fruit from Sylhet, mainly used for flavourings in curries. Bangladeshi cooking has become popular in Britain because of the number of Bangladeshi-owned restaurants, which has increased significantly. In 1946, there were 20 restaurants, while in 2015 there are 8,200 owned by Bangladeshis, out of a total of 9,500 Indian restaurants in the UK.

British Bangladeshis have made a number of recent contributions to the culinary heritage of inner-city London. Drawing on the kebab culture introduced to the city by its Turkish and Kurdish population, as well as the city's chicken shop culture, British Bangladeshis have invented dishes such as naga doner, shatkora doner and naga wings. These fusion dishes are popular with South Asian Londoners, particularly in the East End.

Media
There are five Bengali channels available on satellite television in Britain. These include Channel S, NTV, ATN Bangla, TV One, IQRA Bangla and iON TV. Bengali newspapers have been increasing within the community, most prominent of these include Potrika, Janomot, Surma News Group and Bangla Post. The first international film based on a story about British Bangladeshis was Brick Lane (2007), based on the novel by author Monica Ali, her book is about a woman who moves to London from rural Bangladesh, with her husband, wedded in an arranged marriage. The film was critically acclaimed and the novel was an award-winning best seller. The film however caused some controversy within the community. Other films created in the community are mainly based on the struggles which British Bangladeshis face such as drugs and presenting a culture clash. These dramas include, Shopner Desh (2006) – a story related to the culture clashes. In 2020, BBC Four released an episode of A Very British History focusing on the history of British Bangladeshis and Bangladeshi emigration to the United Kingdom from the 1960s onwards, hosted by Dr Aminul Hoque.

Festivals
Religious Muslim festivals are celebrated by the community each year including Eid al-Adha and Eid ul-Fitr. Muslims dress for the occasion in traditionally Bangladeshi style clothing. Children are given clothing or money. Eid prayers are attended by large numbers of men. Relatives, friends, and neighbors visit and exchange food and sweets. In the evening, young people will often spend the remaining time socialising with friends. Some, however, will go "cruising" – travelling across cities in expensive hired cars, playing loud music and sometimes waving the Bangladesh flag. Sociologists suggest these British Bangladeshi boys and girls have reinterpreted the older, more traditional practice of their faith and culture. The Eid al-Adha is celebrated after Hajj, to commemorate the prophet Ibrahim's compliance to sacrifice his son Isma'il. Traditionally, an animal has to be sacrificed, and its meat distributed among family, friends, and the poor as zakat (charity). In the UK, however, people usually purchase the meat from specialized shops. Instead of distributing meat, some donate to mosques, or remit money to Bangladesh for the purchase of cows for sacrifice and distribution there.

Society

Notables

Rushanara Ali is the first person of Bangladeshi origin to have been elected as a member of parliament during the 2010 general election for the Labour Party from the constituency of Bethnal Green and Bow, winning by a large majority of more than 10,000. Tulip Siddiq became a member of parliament in the 2015 elections, getting elected from Camden Town. Tulip is the niece of the sitting Prime Minister of Bangladesh Sheikh Hasina and granddaughter of Bangabandhu Sheikh Mujibur Rahman the founder father of Bangladesh. Baroness Uddin was the first Bangladeshi and Muslim woman to enter the House of Lords; she swore the oath of office in her own faith. Anwar Choudhury became the British High Commissioner for Bangladesh in 2004, the first non-white British person to be appointed in a senior diplomatic post. Lutfur Rahman is the first directly elected mayor of Tower Hamlets, who was later removed from office for breaching electoral rules. Enam Ali became the first Muslim and the first representative of the British curry industry to be granted Freedom of the City of London in recognition of his contribution to the Indian hospitality industry. Dr. Muhammad Abdul Bari is the chairman of the Muslim Council of Britain – the largest Muslim organisation in Britain. Murad Qureshi, a Labour politician, is a member of the Greater London Assembly.

Others have contributed in the British media and business worlds. Konnie Huq is the longest-serving female presenter in Blue Peter, a BBC television programme for children. Other notable national TV presenters have included Lisa Aziz of Sky News, Nina Hossain (ITV and BBC London), Tasmin Lucia Khan (BBC News) and Shawkat Hashmi is Community Editor at BBC Sheffield, (BBC News). In drama, Shefali Chowdhury and Afshan Azad both starred in the Harry Potter movies as Parvati and Padma Patil. Mumzy is an R&B and hip-hop music artist, the first Bangladeshi to release a music single. Syed Ahmed is a businessman and also a television star, well known for being a candidate on The Apprentice. There are many other entrepreneurs, including the late Abdul Latif, known for his dish "Curry Hell"; Iqbal Ahmed, placed at number 511 on the Sunday Times Rich List 2006, and celebrity chef Tommy Miah. Rizwan Hussain is also very well known for presenting Islamic and charity shows on Channel S and Islam Channel, mainly known within the community.

Artists include fashion designer and artist Rahemur Rahman, dancer and choreographer Akram Khan, pianist Zoe Rahman, vocalist Suzana Ansar and Sohini Alam (born 1978), and the visual artist on film and photography Runa Islam.

Notable authors who have received praise for their books include Zia Haider Rahman whose debut novel In the Light of What We Know was published in 2014, Ed Husain, who wrote the book The Islamist on account of his experience for five years with the Hizb ut-Tahrir, Monica Ali for her book Brick Lane a story based on a Bangladeshi woman, and Kia Abdullah for her book, Life, Love and Assimilation.

Large numbers of people from the Bangladeshi community have also been involved with local government, increasingly in the London boroughs of Tower Hamlets and Camden. The majority of the councillors in Tower Hamlets are of Bangladeshi descent and part of the Labour Party. As of 2009, 32 of the total 51 councillors were Bangladeshi (63%), 18 were White (35%) and 1 Somali (2%). The first Bangladeshi mayor in the country was Ghulam Murtuza in Tower Hamlets. Camden has appointed many Bangladeshis as mayors since the first, Nasim Ali. The London Borough of Islington followed suit in the year 2012; appointing councillor Jilani Chowdhury as their mayor.

Sports

Anwar Uddin was the first notable British Bangladeshi footballer to achieve notability. He began his career at West Ham United, where he joined the winning team of the 1999 FA Youth Cup Finals. In May 2015, he was appointed manager of Sporting Bengal United. Hamza Choudhury currently plays for Leicester City F.C., making him the first player of Bengali descent to play in the Premier League, and he has also made appearances for the England under-21 team.

British Bangladeshis have also engaged themselves in other sports like cricket, snooker and badminton. Bulbul Hussain of Whitechapel is a wheelchair rugby player of Bengali origin, and he has been a part of the Great Paralympic Team since 2008.

In 2012, British kickboxing champion Ruqsana Begum was among the nine people of Bangladeshi descent who carried the Olympic torch along with some 8,000 Britons across the UK. Architectural and graphic designer Saiman Miah was the designer for the two commemorative £5 coins released by British Royal Mint to mark the 2012 London Olympic Games. Akram Khan was a choreographer of the Olympic opening ceremony. Khan was in direction when 12,000 dance artistes performed in the Olympic opening ceremony. Enam Ali's Le Raj restaurant was selected as one of the official food suppliers of the London Olympics. The restaurant also prepared and provided Iftar to the Muslim guests at the Olympics.

Political identity

In Bangladeshi politics there are two groups, favouring different principles, one Islamic and the other secular. Between these groups, there has always been rivalry; however, the Islamic faction is steadily growing. This division between religious and secular was an issue during the Bangladesh Liberation War; the political history of Bangladesh is now is being re-interpreted again, in the UK. The secular group show nationalism through monuments, or through the introduction of Bengali culture, and the Islamic group mainly through dawah.

One symbol of Bengali nationalism is the Shaheed Minar, which commemorates the Bengali Language Movement, present in Altab Ali Park – the park is also the main venue for rallies and demonstrations, and also in Westwood, Oldham. The monuments are a smaller replica of the one in Dhaka, Bangladesh, and symbolises a mother and the martyred sons. Nationalism is mainly witnessed during celebrations of the mela, when groups such as the Swadhinata Trust try to promote Bengali history and heritage amongst young people, in schools, youth clubs and community centres.

According to a 2013 survey by the Center on Dynamics of Ethnicity (CoDE) at the University of Manchester, ethnic minorities in the country were more likely to describe themselves as exclusively "British" than their white British counterparts. 72% of Bangladeshis reported an exclusive "British" identity, in contrast 72% of white Britons preferred to call themselves "English" rather than the more expansive "British" designation. A 2009 study by the University of Surrey suggested that some Bangladeshis in Britain, particularly the youth, embrace their "Britishness" while feeling alienated from "Englishness". The underlying assumption was that "Englishness" was associated with "whiteness" whereas "Britishness" denoted a more universal kind of identity that encompasses various cultural and racial backgrounds.

Youth gangs
As a response to conditions faced by their first generation elders during the 1970s  (see history), younger Bangladeshis started to form gangs, developing a sense of dominating their territory. One consequence of this was that Bangladeshi gangs began fighting each other. Bangladeshi teenagers involved with gangs show their allegiance to this kind of lifestyle in various ways: heavily styled hair, expensive mobile phones and fashionable labels and brands. Teenage street gangs have been responsible for sometimes lethal violence; it is estimated that in Tower Hamlets alone there are 2,500 Bengali youths affiliated to one of the many local gangs, and that 26 out of the 27 gangs in the area are Bangladeshi. The notorious gangs have been given names that end with massive or posse, such as the Brick Lane Massive and Brady Street Massive. Other smaller groups include the Shadwell Crew, Cannon Street Posse, Bengal Tigers and Bethnal Green Boys.

In the past, Bangladeshi gangs have fostered criminal elements, including low level drug use and credit card fraud. However, for many the focus has changed to fighting over their territories. They use a variety of weapons, such as samurai swords, machetes, kitchen knives and meat cleavers, although guns are rarely used. When members reach their twenties they usually grow out of gang membership, but some move on to more serious criminal activity. Increasing numbers of Bangladeshi youths are taking hard drugs, in particular heroin. Islamic fundamentalism has also played a part in the youth culture, illustrated by the efforts of one Brick Lane gang to oust prostitutes from the area. As to dietary customs, youths generally avoid eating pork, and some from drinking alcohol; however many take part in recreational drug use, in particular heroin.

Business

95% of all South Asian restaurants are run by Bangladeshis. The curry industry employs over 150,000 people, contributes £4.5 billion to the economy each year and is viewed as recognition of Bangladeshi success, through awards such as 'The British Curry Awards'. Brick Lane, known as Banglatown, is home to many of these restaurants, and is now regarded as London's 'curry capital', with thousands of visitors every day. The restaurants serve different types of curry dishes, including fish, chutneys, and other halal dishes. Attitudes towards restaurant work has shifted among second-generation Bangladeshis who lack interest in working in the curry industry due to their social mobility and opportunities provided by their parents. As of 2016, according to the Bangladesh High Commission, Brick Lane has 57 Bangladeshi-owned curry houses, and in England as a whole, around 90% of all curry houses are owned by British Bangladeshis.

Although the curry industry has been the primary business of Bangladeshis (see Cuisine), many other Bangladeshis own grocery stores. Whitechapel is a thriving local street market, offering many low-priced goods for the local Bengali community. In Brick Lane there are many Bengali staples available, such as frozen fish and jack fruits. There are also many travel agents offering flights to Sylhet. Many Bangladeshi businesses located in the East End wish to maintain a link with Sylhet, for example the Weekly Sylheter Dak or the Sylhet Stores. There are also many money transfer companies; in 2007, a firm called First Solution Money Transfer went into liquidation. Company chairman, Dr Fazal Mahmood, admitted the business owed hundreds of thousands of pounds to the public. and claimed that the firm had lost control of the money it handled due to a lack of regulation. Other large companies include Seamark and IBCO, owned by millionaire Iqbal Ahmed, Taj Stores, and many others.

In 2004, Guild of Bangladeshi Restaurateurs requested for ethnic restaurant staff positions to be designated as a shortage occupation, which would make it easier for Bangladeshi citizens to obtain UK work permits. In 2008, Guild of Bangladeshi Restaurateurs members raised concerns that many restaurants were under threat because the British Government announced a change in immigration laws which could block entry of high skilled chefs from Bangladesh to the UK. They requested that the Government recognises that they are skilled workers. The law demanded these workers speak fluent English, and have good formal qualifications. However, these changes did not take place.

Immigration policy changes has made it more difficult to source skilled workers from abroad, resulting in a paucity of chefs with the culinary skills to run an Indian-style kitchen. The situation has worsened due to a yearly salary minimum of £35,000 applied to tier 2 migrants, or skilled workers with a job offer in the UK, coming into effect April 2016. The Government's cap on skilled-workers from outside the EU means chefs must earn this salary a year to be permitted to work in UK restaurants. A Government scheme set up in 2012 to train UK nationals to work as chefs in Asian and Oriental restaurants struggled with a lack of interest, despite a YouGov poll at the time indicating that almost a third of young people would consider working in the sector. Experts say curry houses are closing down at the rate of two a week because of a shortage of tandoori chefs.

Remittance

The UK is the second biggest foreign investor in Bangladesh and one of the largest development partners of Bangladesh. Over 240 UK companies are operating in different sectors including retail, banking, energy, infrastructure, consultancy and education with leading centres of operation in Dhaka, Chittagong and Sylhet.

Many British Bangladeshis send money to Bangladesh to build houses. In villages in Sylhet, there are houses built suburbs or communities through financial support mainly received from the UK, fuelling a building boom. Businesses have also been established by the British expatriates in the city of Sylhet, such as hotels, restaurants, often themed on those found in London, have also been established to cater to the visiting Sylheti expatriate population and the growing Sylheti middle classes (i.e. London Fried Chicken or Tessco). The financial relationship between British Bengalis and relatives in Bangladesh has changed, only 20% of Bangladeshi families in east London were sending money to Bangladesh as of 1995, this figure was approximately 85% during 1960–1970s. For a large number of families in Britain the cost of living, housing, or education for the children severely constrains any regular financial commitment towards Bangladesh. Moreover, the family reunion process has resulted in the social and economic reproduction of the household in Britain; conflicts over land or money can arise involving the mutual or reciprocal relationship between members of a joint household divided by migration. This, in turn, can reduce even more the level of investment in Sylhet. The emergence of a second and a third generation of British Bangladeshis is another factor explaining the declining proportion of people's income being sent as remittances to Bangladesh. About 7% of all remittance sent to Bangladesh are from Britain as of 2019. As of January 2020, $1175m is sent from UK to Bangladesh per year.

See also

 Bangladeshi diaspora
 Bengali people
 British Indians
 British Pakistanis
 British Sri Lankans 
 East Asians in the United Kingdom
 History of Bangladeshis in the United Kingdom
 List of Bangladeshi people
 List of Bangladesh-related topics
 List of Bengalis
 List of British Bangladeshis
 List of British Muslims

References

Further reading

Notes

External links
 Bangladeshi diaspora in the UK
 Bangladesh High Commission
 UK in Bangladesh
 British Bangladesh Professional Association
 British Bangladeshi Who's Who
 Street Food – London's Brick Lane
 Down the Surma – Origins of the Diaspora
 Bondor Bazar to Brick Lane
 Subject Guide on Bangladeshi London

 
 
 
British people of South Asian descent
Bangladeshi diaspora
British Muslims
Muslim communities in Europe